Pietari is a Finnish male name and an interpretation of the names Petrus and Peter. It may refer to:

 Pietari, Finnish and Karelian exonym for Saint Petersburg, Russia
 Pietari Inkinen (born 1980), Finnish violinist and conductor
 Pietari Jääskeläinen (born 1947), Finnish politician
 Pietari Holopainen (born 1982), Finnish professional football player
 Pietari Päivärinta (1827–1913), Finnish writer and Diet member
 Pietari Särkilahti, Finnish disciple of Martin Luther
 Pietari Kalm, Swedish-Finnish explorer, botanist, naturalist